Sérgio Sano (born 18 January 1963) is a Brazilian judoka. He competed in the men's half-lightweight event at the 1984 Summer Olympics.

References

External links
 

1963 births
Living people
Brazilian male judoka
Olympic judoka of Brazil
Judoka at the 1984 Summer Olympics
Sportspeople from São Paulo (state)